Rousseau is a French surname. Notable people with the surname include:

Arts 
Eugene Rousseau (saxophonist) (born 1932), American saxophonist
Frederick Rousseau (born 1958), French musician
Henri Rousseau (1844–1910), French naive painter, also known as Douanier Rousseau
Jacques Rousseau (painter) (1630–1693), French  trompe l'œil painter
Jean Rousseau (1644–1699), French musician and author
Jean-Baptiste Rousseau (1671–1741), French poet
Jean-Jacques Rousseau (1712–1778), Genevan author and philosopher
Jean-Jacques Rousseau (author-filmmaker) (1946-2014), Belgian film director
Jeanne Rij-Rousseau (1870–1956), French painter and art theorist
Jean Simeon Rousseau de la Rottiere (1747–1820), French decorative painter
Nita Rousseau (1949–2003), French writer
Philippe Rousseau (1816–1887), French still life painter
Samuel Rousseau (born 1971), French artist
Samuel-Alexandre Rousseau (1853-1904), French composer
Serge Rousseau (1930–2007), French film and television actor
Stéphane Rousseau (b. 1966), Canadian actor
Théodore Rousseau (1812–1867), French painter

Science 
Cecil C. Rousseau (1938–2020), American mathematician
Denis Rousseau, American scientist
Frederic Rousseau, Belgian molecular biologist
Judith Rousseau, French statistician

Sports 
Alex Rousseau (water polo) (born 1967), American water polo player
Bobby Rousseau (born 1940), Canadian ice hockey player
Eugène Rousseau (chess player) (c.1810–1870), French chess player
Florian Rousseau (born 1974), French cyclist
Gregory Rousseau (born 2000), American football player
Maurice Rousseau (1906-1977), French Olympic gymnast
Michel Rousseau (1936–2016), French amateur track cyclist
Odette Rousseau (1927-2012), French parachutist
Jacques Rousseau (athlete) (born 1951), French track and field athlete
Vincent Rousseau (born 1962), Belgian runner
Yves Rousseau, French aviator

Politics and military 
André Rousseau (1911–2002), Quebec politician and businessman
Jeannie de Clarens, née Rousseau (1919-2017), French resistance fighter and spy
Lovell Rousseau (1818–1869), American general
René Waldeck-Rousseau (1846–1904), French politician
Roger Rousseau (1921–1986), Canadian ambassador

Other fields 
Domaine Armand Rousseau, wine producer in Burgundy, France
Isaac Rousseau (1672–1747), Genevan master-clockmaker and Jean-Jacques Rousseau's father
Samuel Rousseau (1763–1820), British printer and orientalist scholar
Philip Rousseau, scholar of early Christianity

As a given name 
Rousseau Owen Crump (1843–1901), American politician and businessman
Rousseau H. Flower (1913–1988), American paleontologist
Victor Rousseau Emanuel (1879–1960), British writer

Fictional 
Danielle Rousseau, character on the American TV show Lost
Alexandra Rousseau, her daughter

See also
Rossouw

French-language surnames